Nourredine Bahri (born 9 July 1987), better known by his stage name Niro, is a Moroccan-born French rapper from Blois. In 2013, he was signed to the AZ label after many years with the rap label Street Lourd formed by members of the French rap collective Mafia K'1 Fry.

Career
He started earlier releasing his street album Niroshima III in 2007. Niro became the first independent act to be signed to Street Lourd. His first single "70 Kg" was released in 2011 followed by "Dans ton kwaah" and "Pikassos". He was featured on recordings by well-known rappers including Seth Gueko, Kery James and Booba. He is considered one of the prominent figures of French "street rap" (le rap de rue).

In 2012, he released his debut studio album Paraplégique that contained many of his earlier hits. Immediately after the release of the album, he was involved in legal problems on some minor charges, arrested after a police chase and sentenced to a five-month term.

While in jail, he composed his second album Rééducation that he released to critical acclaim in 2013 addressing his legal problems. In 2014, he returned with a third album Miraculé. He followed this with Si je me souviens in 2015 and Or Game in 2016.

Discography

Albums

Street albums
2012 : Paraplégique (Street Lourd/Musicast)

Singles

As lead artist

As featured artist

Other charted songs

References

External links
Facebook

French rappers
1988 births
Living people
Rappers from Loir-et-Cher
French people of Moroccan descent